Antelias Cave was a large cave located  east of Antelias,  northeast of Beirut close to the wadi of Ksar Akil.

It was discovered by Heidenborg in 1833. Godefroy Zumoffen made an excavation in 1893, finding an Aurignacian industry amongst large quantities of bones and flints. Henri Fleisch re-examined the material from Zumoffen's excavation and concluded that it was not solely Aurignacian but showed evidence of successive industries present as late as the Neolithic. Raoul Desribes also excavated the site and found numerous tools made of bone including two harpoons which are now in the Museum of Lebanese Prehistory. Auguste Bergy also made a small excavation here and another sounding was made possibly in 1948 by J. Ewing who described the industry as "transitional, Upper Paleolithic-to-Mesolithic". Dirk Albert Hooijer studied the fauna from the cave and found Dama and Capra to have been predominant. Neolithic finds included a long, denticulated, lustrous blade. Bones of a human foetus were also found in the cave by Delore in 1901 which were published by Vallois in 1957 as being possibly Neolithic in date. Collections from the cave can be found in the Musée de l'Homme, Paris, Museum of Lebanese Prehistory and the Archaeological Museum of the American University of Beirut.

Antelias cave was destroyed by dynamite in the spring of 1964 due to quarrying in the area. Lorraine Copeland and Peter J. Wescombe recovered some cave deposits from which they hoped to extract material for radio-carbon dating.

Further reading
 Copeland, Lorraine., The early Upper Palaeolithic material from levels VII-V, Antelias Cave, Lebanon Berytus, 19, 99-143, 45, 1970.
 Copeland, Lorraine and Hours, Francis., The later Upper Palaeolithic material from Antelias Cave, Lebanon, Levels IV-I, Berytus, 20, 57-138, 82, 1971.
 Copeland, Lorraine., "Natufian Sites in Lebanon" in Bar-Yosef and Valla (eds.) 1991, The Natufian Culture in the Levant, 27-42, 16, 1991.

Footnotes

External links
 The Natural History Museum Catalogue of Fossil Hominids
 University of Cologne Radio-Carbon context database entry for Antelias cave

Neolithic settlements
Archaeological sites in Lebanon